Fernando Olivié González-Pumariega (1925 – 1 March 2021) was a Spanish diplomat. He served as Spanish ambassador to Paraguay, Colombia, Yugoslavia, Belgium, and Poland.

Biography
Olivié began studying at the Diplomatic School of Spain in 1948, which took him to the Spanish Consulate in Montreal. He later served as Secretary to the Spanish Embassy in Ottawa. In 1954, he began working at the Spanish Ministry of Foreign Affairs, where he held various positions, such as Director of Political Affairs for the Philippines and the Far East, Director of Political Affairs of Western Europe, and Director General of Europe, where he actively participated in discussions on Gibraltar under Minister of Foreign Affairs Fernando María Castiella. In 1970, he was appointed Ambassador of Spain to Paraguay. He then became Ambassador to Colombia, Yugoslavia, Belgium, and Poland. He then retired in 1990.

Fernando Olivié González-Pumariega died in Pozuelo de Alarcón on 1 March 2021 at the age of 96.

Distinctions
Grand Cross of the Order of Civil Merit
Grand Cross of Naval Merit
Grand Cross of Military Merit
Grand Cross of Aeronautical Merit
Commendation of the Order of Isabella the Catholic
Commendation of the Order of Charles III
Commander of the Ordre national du Mérite
Commander of the Order of Merit of the Italian Republic
Commander of the Order of Merit of the Federal Republic of Germany
Legion of Honour

References

1925 births
2021 deaths
Spanish diplomats
Ambassadors of Spain to Belgium
Ambassadors of Spain to Poland
People from Madrid
Grand Cross of the Order of Civil Merit
Grand Crosses of Naval Merit
Grand Crosses of Military Merit
Crosses of Aeronautical Merit
Commanders of the Order of Isabella the Catholic
Commanders of the Order of Merit of the Italian Republic
Commanders Crosses of the Order of Merit of the Federal Republic of Germany
Recipients of the Legion of Honour
Spanish expatriates in Canada